Gustave Ganay (28 March 1892 – 23 August 1926) was a French racing cyclist. He rode in the 1920 Tour de France.

References

External links
 

1892 births
1926 deaths
French male cyclists
Place of birth missing